David Harold Karr, born David Katz (1918, Brooklyn, New York – 7 July 1979, Paris) was a controversial American journalist, businessman, Communist and NKVD agent.

Early life

Enthralled with the radical left, Karr began writing at a relatively young age for the Communist Party USA publication, the Daily Worker.

Espionage allegations

In 1943, Karr came under the scrutiny of Representative Martin Dies Jr., chairman of the House Special Committee on Un-American Activities for his communist affiliations. Karr was at the time working for the Office of War Information (OWI). Karr appeared before the committee and stated under oath that he was an informant for the FBI, but that testimony was entirely a manufactured story. A special congressional investigation found no cause to remove him, but at the same time, the Civil Service Commission concluded he was both untruthful and unreliable. Karr resigned from the OWI and was immediately hired by Drew Pearson, one of America's most widely read columnists. 

With the release of the Venona decrypts, a decryption from June 1944 established that Karr was an informational source for the NKVD. In it, Soviet agent Vladimir Pravdin reported to Moscow information he stated he received from Soviet TASS deputy bureau chief Samuel Krafsur from his contact (Karr).

Karr earned a reputation as an unscrupulous investigative reporter who misrepresented himself to sources. In 1944, Karr was also active in Vice President Henry Wallace's effort to remain on the presidential ticket.  President Franklin Roosevelt referred to Karr as a "chronic liar." During the war, Karr was investigated twice by the FBI, once after obtaining a secret report on Soviet leader Joseph Stalin prepared for President Roosevelt by Oskar Lange, another NKVD source in the administration. To obtain the report, Karr claimed to be on the staff of US Vice President Henry Wallace.

On 12 September 1946, Pearson wrote an article based on a classified US military study of British military operations against the Greek Communist insurgency. The article, which alarmed the U.S. State Department, contained highly classified information on the British order of battle in Greece. The document had been in the office of the Director of the Office of Special Political Affairs, one Alger Hiss. An investigation revealed that the original document was missing and that the information reached Pearson through his aide, David Karr. The FBI suspected that Karr was working for the KGB and that his income was derived in part from the Soviet government.

The FBI had Phillip Jaffe under audio surveillance during the Amerasia investigation and overheard Jaffe discussing with Andrew Roth various possible contacts for information from government sources. Roth told Jaffe that Karr could obtain "a lot of stuff on the Far Eastern things that the other guys don't get because of his Treasury connections.  He goes up once a week with Harry"." Jaffe inquired as to whether this was Harry Dexter White, already under suspicion for communicating information to the Soviet Union; Roth stated that it was.  In 1950, Senator Joseph McCarthy referred to Karr as Pearson's "KGB controller".

Karr later began a series of articles on the use of public relations in business takeovers. In 1959, Karr became CEO of the Fairbanks-Whitney Corporation, a large defense contractor whose divisions included Colt Firearms. After three years the shareholders dismissed him. Karr then turned to film and hotel businesses, and in 1971, he became associated with Armand Hammer, who expanded Karr's contacts and business opportunities in the Soviet Union. Karr became a good friend of the son-in-law of Soviet Premier Alexei Kosygin, Dzherman Gvishiani, and was granted both North and South American trademark rights to Misha the Bear, the mascot of the 1980 Olympic games. Along with Hammer, he formed a joint venture to make and sell Olympic commemorative coins, an enterprise estimated to be worth some U.S. $200 million.

Karr frequently boasted of having close ties with prominent US senators and presidential candidates and that he transmitted information between the Soviet and American governments on such issues as détente, trade, and strategic-arms negotiations. Karr, then living in Paris, headed a Franco-American firm called Finatec. According to KGB files, Karr arranged meetings between Sen. Edward Kennedy and Soviet leaders. A KGB file describes Kennedy in 1978 trying to help a close friend, former Senator John V. Tunney of California, get some business in the Soviet Union.

In 1992, Yevgenia Albats, a Russian journalist assigned by the Russian Parliament to examine the archives after the aborted Soviet coup attempt of 1991, quoted "an extremely top secret KGB memo to Soviet leaders:"

In late 1978, as Occidental Petroleum was attempting an unfriendly takeover of the Mead Corporation, Karr told a bizarre story in secret testimony before the Securities and Exchange Commission. Karr said that one night in 1972, he was summoned to a hotel in Moscow to find Hammer in his pajamas, in tears and on his knees, pleading with two KGB agents not to arrest him.  Hammer was being accused of bribery and smuggling two letters written by the founder of the Soviet Union, Vladimir Lenin, letters that Hammer had purchased at an auction in New York. Karr said that Hammer was let off the hook by agreeing to donate the treasures to the Soviet Union.

Death

Within days of learning of Karr's public disclosure, Hammer dropped his takeover bid of Meade. Seven months later, in July 1979, hours after returning from a trip to Moscow, Karr was found dead in suspicious circumstances in his Paris hotel room.  Amid suspicions that Karr had been murdered, his widow halted the burial so that an autopsy could be performed. One claim was that Karr had swindled his Russian partners. Rumors linked his friend Gvishiani to bribery scandals. Israeli intelligence officials claimed Karr was involved in secret Russian arms sales to states on the U.S. State Department's terrorist watchlist, namely Libya and Uganda.

After the collapse of the Soviet Union in 1992, in the new atmosphere of openness, Soviet investigative journalist Albats published an article in Izvestia quoting documents from KGB archives that Karr was "a competent KGB source" who "submitted information to the KGB on the technical capabilities of the United States and other capitalist countries."

Legacy

In 2009, his grandson Doug Karr made the short film Ten for Grandpa about his fabled ancestor. A fast-paced investigation into Karr's complex life, the film premiered at the 2009 Sundance Film Festival.

References

Yevgenia Albats, Senator Edward Kennedy Requested KGB Assistance With a Profitable Contract for his Businessman-Friend, Izvestia 24 June 1992, 5.
Paul Quinn-Judge and Kathryn Tolbert, KGB file tells of prime treatment for Sen. Kennedy The Boston Globe 24 June 1992. 
Statement of Rep. Fred E. Busbey, Congressional Record 18 February 1944, A876.
Statement of Rep. Martin Dies, Congressional Record 1 February 1943, 504–516.
Extension of Remarks of Hon. Francis E. Walter, Congressional Record 6 February 1957.
Henry Wallace Papers: see Harold Young from Oskar Lange, 3 July 1944.
Washington Post, 3 July 1944.
FBI Silvermaster file, (PDF p. 33).
Washington Post, 4 July 1994.
Arthur Schlesinger, Jr. to Harvey Klehr, 18 April 1990.
John Earl Haynes and Harvey Klehr, Venona: Decoding Soviet Espionage in America, New Haven: Yale University Press, 1999, pgs. 244–247.
Yevgenia Albats, Reporting Stories in Russia That No One Will Publish Nieman Reports, The Nieman Foundation for Journalism at Harvard University, Vol. 53 No. 4 Winter 1999.

1918 births
1979 deaths
American spies for the Soviet Union
American people in the Venona papers
Espionage in the United States
People of the United States Office of War Information